The 2000 Houston Astros season was the 39th season for the Major League Baseball (MLB) franchise in Houston, Texas. This was the first season for the Astros at Minute Maid Park (christened as Enron Field and known as such until 2002).

Offseason
 December 13, 1999: Johan Santana was drafted from the Astros by the Florida Marlins in the 1999 rule 5 draft.
 January 6, 2000: Dwight Gooden was signed as a free agent by the Astros.

Regular season
On August 14 in Philadelphia, first baseman Jeff Bagwell homered twice and tied a club record with seven runs batted in (RBI) in a 14–7 win, shared by Rafael Ramírez and Pete Incaviglia.

Bagwell again homered twice on August 19 against the Milwaukee Brewers for the 299th and 300th of his career; the second home run broke an eighth-inning tie to give Houston a 10–8 win.  He joined Hank Aaron, Joe DiMaggio, Frank Robinson and Ted Williams as the fifth player in major league history to record 300 home runs, 1,000 RBI and 1,000 runs scored in his first ten seasons.

Bagwell scored 152 runs to lead the major leagues. It was the highest total in a season since Lou Gehrig in 1936, and his 295 runs scored from 1999–2000 set a National League two-season record.

Despite finishing 18 games below .500, the Astros set the all-time NL record for most home runs hit by one team in the regular season, with 249. The record was later broken by the Los Angeles Dodgers in 2019.

Season standings

Record vs. opponents

Notable transactions
 March 31, 2000: Tony Mounce was released by the Astros.
 April 13, 2000: Dwight Gooden was purchased from the Astros by the Tampa Bay Devil Rays.

Roster

Player stats

Batting

Starters by position 
Note: Pos = Position; G = Games played; AB = At bats; H = Hits; Avg. = Batting average; HR = Home runs; RBI = Runs batted in

Other batters 
Note: G = Games played; AB = At bats; H = Hits; Avg. = Batting average; HR = Home runs; RBI = Runs batted in

Pitching

Starting pitchers 
Note: G = Games pitched; IP = Innings pitched; W = Wins; L = Losses; ERA = Earned run average; SO = Strikeouts

Other pitchers 
Note: G = Games pitched; IP = Innings pitched; W = Wins; L = Losses; ERA = Earned run average; SO = Strikeouts

Dotel was team leader in saves with 16.

Relief pitchers 
Note: G = Games pitched; W = Wins; L = Losses; SV = Saves; ERA = Earned run average; SO = Strikeouts

Awards and honors
The Astros led the National League in home runs with 249

Farm system

LEAGUE CHAMPIONS: Round Rock, Michigan

References

External links
2000 Houston Astros season at Baseball Reference

Houston Astros seasons
Houston Astros season
Houston Astros